Mahmoud Alavi (born 4 May 1954) is an Iranian conservative politician, and formerly minister of intelligence in Hassan Rouhani's government.

Early life
Alavi was born in Lamerd, Fars province, in 1954. He holds a PhD in Islamic jurisprudence and law from Ferdowsi University in Mashad.

Career
Alavi is a cleric and a scholar of Islamic jurisprudence. He holds the religious rank of Ayatollah.  He is the former head of the political and ideological body of the Iranian Army to which he was appointed by the Supreme Leader Ali Khamenei. Alavi served in the post from 2000 to August 2009. In addition, Alavi was Khamenei's special representative in the army until August 2009. He also assumed the post of deputy defense minister.

He served at the Majlis as Tehran representative for four terms during the terms of former presidents Rafsanjani and Khatami. He ran for office in the list of Resistance Front of the Islamic Revolution led by Mohsen Rezaee in the 2012 election. However, Alavi's nomination was rejected by the Guardian Council on the grounds that he did not have "practical commitment to Islam and the regime."

He is a member of the Assembly of Experts. He served as Hassan Rouhani’s liaison officer for the city of Qom and the institutions there in the 2013 presidential elections. Alavi was designated as intelligence minister by Rouhani on 4 August 2013. He was approved for the post on 15 August by the Majlis with 227 Yes votes.

Views
Ali Reza Eshraghi of the University of North Carolina at Chapel Hill argues that Alavi is a principalist politician in the Iranian political arena. He is, therefore, a conservative figure and close to Mohsen Rezaee. Alavi publicly criticized the Ali Akbar Rafsanjani's disqualification for the 2013 presidential election soon after the election.

Human rights violations 

As Minister of Intelligence (July 2013- August 2021) he perpetrated 6 human rights violations:

 He was responsible for the death of Saro Ghahremani, arrested during the January 2018 protests, and the arrest and coerced televised confession of Mohammad Ghahremani, Saro Ghahremani's father.

 He was responsible for the detention, torture and killing of protesters during the 2017-2018 protests, as well as the suspicious deaths of protesters in the custody of Intelligence Ministry agents.
The 2017-2018 nationwide protests, known as the December 2017 protests, were large-scale demonstrations to protest against inflation and corruption, which began on 28 December 2017 in Mashhad and several cities in Khorasan province and quickly spread across Iran, including with harsher anti-government slogans. The crackdown on protesters resulted in the deaths of at least 25 protesters and several detainees.

 He has been responsible for the pressure and mass detention of Baha'i citizens for their religious beliefs, including 17 Baha'i citizens who were arrested in three cities of Isfahan, Shiraz and Karaj between September and October 2018.

 He was responsible for the arrest and torture of trade union activists, including Esmail Bakhshi and Sepideh Gholian, and the suppression of peaceful protests by sugar cane workers in Haft Tappeh.

 He was responsible for the detention of civil society activists and the persecution and harassment of their families in 2018 to prevent them from speaking to the press.

 He was responsible for the killing and detention of protesters during the November 2019 protests, as well as threatening and pressuring their families to refrain from providing information to the press and holding memorial services.

References

External links

1954 births
Living people
People from Fars Province
Ferdowsi University of Mashad alumni
Iranian Islamic religious leaders
Iranian scholars
Ministers of Intelligence of Iran
Members of the 1st Islamic Consultative Assembly
Members of the 2nd Islamic Consultative Assembly
Members of the 4th Islamic Consultative Assembly
Members of the 5th Islamic Consultative Assembly
Resistance Front of Islamic Iran politicians
Iranian individuals subject to the U.S. Department of the Treasury sanctions